Svend Kenneth Hansen, born 29 September 1960 and hailing from Götene, is a Swedish rallycross driver with Danish roots. His late father, Svend Hansen, can be regarded as the inventor of the so-called Joker Lap for rallycross. Hansen has been part of the European rallycross elite since the late 1980s and has won an FIA European Championships for Rallycross Drivers title no less than 14 times up until the year 2008. He holds most of the records for rallycross, including the amount (249) of attended European rounds.

Racing career
Hansen began his racing career with karting in 1976 and via folkrace and rallying made his way to national rallycross in 1983. After a few years successful national racing, crowned by his first Swedish Rallycross Championship in 1986 when he drove a Volvo Amazon, he entered international rallycross in 1987 with an ex-Lars Nyström Volvo 240 Turbo. After changing to a 500+bhp Ford Sierra RS500 Cosworth in 1989 Hansen instantly became the driver to beat of the former Division 1 (2WD Group A cars), claiming the FIA European titles of four consecutive years here. However, in his first year he was, for the first and only time during his ERC career, excluded from an event, after it was proven that he had been using illegal 103 octane race-fuel during the Norwegian 1989 European round.

From 1993 and onwards, Hansen competed exclusively with Citroën cars. At the end of the 2010 season, Hansen wound down his own racing activities to be able to develop his team Hansen Motorsport. In March 2013, Hansen was appointed to the FIA's then-newly created Driver's Commission as one of 12 driver representatives.

Personal life
Kenneth Hansen still lives in his birth town of Götene with his wife Susann Hansen (née Bergvall); herself a successful rallycross driver and winner of the 1994 European Cup for Drivers of Group N cars up to 1400cc. Together they have two sons; Kevin, born in 1998, and Timmy, born in 1992. Both sons have followed their parents footsteps to race in rallycross for Hansen Motorsport.

Racing record

Complete FIA European Rallycross Championship results

Division 1

Division 2

Division 1*

* ''Division 2 was rebranded as Division 1 in 1997.

Supercar

References

External links

 Hansen Motorsport

1960 births
Living people
Swedish racing drivers
European Rallycross Championship drivers
People from Götene Municipality
Sportspeople from Västra Götaland County